"I Love Xmas" (stylized as "I ♥ XMAS") is the 7th single released from Tomoko Kawase's alter-ego, Tommy heavenly6, and the 15th overall single from her solo career. It was released on December 6, 2006, and peaked at No. 29 on the Oricon singles chart. "I Love Xmas" appropriately enough has a Christmas theme surrounding the lyrics as well as the music video.

Music video
The music video features Tomoko Kawase as Tommy heavenly6 and Tommy February6 in similar outfits, singing next to Santa, as well as riding a giant panda. The video has a Christmas theme, and also features scenes from previous music videos.

Track listing
I Love Xmas
The Case
I Love Xmas (Instrumental)

DVD Track listing
I Love Xmas (PV)

References

External links 
 Tommy heavenly6 Official Site
 Scans from I Love Xmas Single

Tomoko Kawase songs
2006 singles
Songs written by Tomoko Kawase